Walkman is the third studio album by Bad Bad Hats. It was released on September 17, 2021, via Don Giovanni Records. The album was named album of the week upon release by The Current, and one of the best albums of the month by Paste

Track listing

References

2021 albums
Don Giovanni Records albums